Catherine Coutelle (born 2 April 1945 in La Sauvagère, Orne) was a member of the National Assembly of France.  She represented the 2nd constituency of the Vienne department,  and is a member of the Socialist Party, which sits with the Socialist, Radical, Citizen and Miscellaneous Left group in the Assembly.

References

1945 births
Living people
People from Orne
Politicians from Normandy
Unified Socialist Party (France) politicians
Socialist Party (France) politicians
Deputies of the 13th National Assembly of the French Fifth Republic
Deputies of the 14th National Assembly of the French Fifth Republic
Women members of the National Assembly (France)
21st-century French women politicians